"Word to the Badd!!" is a song by American musician Jermaine Jackson, taken from his thirteenth studio album You Said (1991). The song was written by Jackson, L.A. Reid, Babyface, Daryl Simmons and labelmates TLC's group member Lisa "Left Eye" Lopes. It was produced by Reid, Babyface, Simmons and Kayo. The song was released as the album's lead single on August 13, 1991, by LaFace Records and Arista Records. 

It reached #78 on the Billboard Hot 100 on  November 30, 1991. It also peaked very low on the Hot R&B/Hip-Hop Songs chart at #88. An early appearance of TLC, the song features vocals from T-Boz, with a rap verse written by former member Lisa "Left Eye" Lopes thus earning her co-writing credit. The original version of the track, later edited for its album appearance, gained significant controversy for its scathing lyrics directed towards Jermaine's brother Michael. Both versions are featured on the 2014 expanded edition of You Said. There was no music video made for the song.

Charts

References

External links
Genius: Word to the Badd!! - Lyrics

1991 singles
1991 songs
Jermaine Jackson songs
Songs written by Daryl Simmons
Songs written by Jermaine Jackson
Songs written by L.A. Reid
Songs written by Babyface (musician)
Songs written by Lisa Lopes
Song recordings produced by Babyface (musician)
Song recordings produced by L.A. Reid
Song recordings produced by Daryl Simmons
LaFace Records singles
Arista Records singles
New jack swing songs
Dance-pop songs
Diss tracks